Tong King King (born 15 March 1965) is a Hong Kong fencer. He competed in the foil and épée events at the 1988 Summer Olympics.

References

External links
 

1965 births
Living people
Hong Kong male épée fencers
Olympic fencers of Hong Kong
Fencers at the 1988 Summer Olympics
Fencers at the 1990 Asian Games
Asian Games competitors for Hong Kong
Hong Kong male foil fencers
20th-century Hong Kong people